Corina Căprioriu (born 18 July 1986) is a Romanian judoka. She has competed under the name Corina Ștefan since her 2016 marriage to Romanian wrestler Gheorghiță Ștefan.

Căprioriu won the silver medal at the 2012 Summer Olympics. She lost in the final against Japan’s Kaori Matsumoto after being disqualified (hansoku) during the golden score period in the women's -57 kg weight class.

She also won the bronze medal in the lightweight division at the 2011 World Judo Championships. Caprioriu was European Champion in 2010 and bronze in 2011. She booked multiple World cup titles since 2010.

She managed to qualify in the final at the 2015 World Judo Championships where she met her opponent from the 2012 Summer Olympics, Kaori Matsumoto. She lost after the Japanese scored a waza-ari. She is the current World No.1 at the Women's -57 kg category.

References

External links
 
 
 

1986 births
Living people
People from Lugoj
Romanian female judoka
Olympic judoka of Romania
Olympic medalists in judo
Olympic silver medalists for Romania
Judoka at the 2012 Summer Olympics
Judoka at the 2016 Summer Olympics
Medalists at the 2012 Summer Olympics
European Games competitors for Romania
Judoka at the 2015 European Games
Judoka at the 2019 European Games
20th-century Romanian women
21st-century Romanian women